Perlow is the surname of:

Aharon Perlow (1839–1897), third Rebbe of Koidanov
Gilbert Jerome Perlow (1916–2007), American physicist
Jason Perlow, technology columnist
Leslie Perlow, American economist 
Yaakov Perlow (1931–2020), Novominsker Rebbe
Kylie Perlow, American Baddie and student